This is a list of mayors of Kumanovo, North Macedonia.

List of Mayors

See also
 Mayor of Kumanovo
 Kumanovo
 Municipality of Kumanovo

References